The 2010 Sacramento State Hornets football team represented California State University, Sacramento as a member of the Big Sky Conference during the 2010 NCAA Division I FCS football season. Led by fourth-year head coach Marshall Sperbeck, Sacramento State compiled an overall record of 6–5 with a mark of 5–3 in conference play, placing in a three-way tie for third in the Big Sky. The team  outscored its opponents 353 to 272 for the season. This was the first winning season for the Hornets since the 2000 team finished 7–4. The Hornets played home games at Hornet Stadium in Sacramento, California.

Schedule

Team players in the NFL
No Sacramento State players were selected in the 2011 NFL Draft.

The following finished their college career in 2010, were not drafted, but played in the NFL.

References

Sacramento State
Sacramento State Hornets football seasons
Sacramento State Hornets football